The 1970–71 season was Cambridge United's first season in the Football League.

On 30 May 1970 Bradford Park Avenue failed to be re-elected to the Football League and Cambridge United were voted to take their place. They had a quiet start to life as a football league club finishing in 20th position with 43 points.

Final league table

Results

Legend

Football League Fourth Division

FA Cup

League Cup

Squad statistics

References
 Cambridge 1970–71 at statto.com 
 Player information sourced from The English National Football Archive

Cambridge United F.C. seasons
Cambridge United